The Swingin' Miss D is a studio album by Dinah Washington, arranged by Quincy Jones. It was recorded in December 1956 and released in September 1957.

Track listing
 "They Didn't Believe Me" (Jerome Kern, Herbert Reynolds) – 2:44
 "You're Crying" (Leonard Feather, Quincy Jones) – 3:29
 "Makin' Whoopee" (Walter Donaldson, Gus Kahn) – 2:26
 "Ev'ry Time We Say Goodbye" (Cole Porter) – 2:27
 "But Not for Me" (George Gershwin, Ira Gershwin) – 2:25
 "Caravan" (Duke Ellington, Irving Mills, Juan Tizol) – 2:37
 "Perdido" (Ervin Drake, H. J. Lengsfelder, Tizol) – 3:23
 "Never Let Me Go" (Ray Evans, Jay Livingston) – 2:42
 "Is You Is or Is You Ain't My Baby?" (Billy Austin, Louis Jordan) – 2:56
 "I'll Close My Eyes" (Buddy Kaye, Billy Reid) – 3:57
 "Somebody Loves Me" (Buddy DeSylva, George Gershwin, Ballard MacDonald) – 2:32
Additional tracks on 1998 CD reissue

15-18 recorded June 25, 1956
12, 13 recorded November 21, 1956
6,7,9,11 recorded December 4, 1956
1,2,4,5 recorded December 5, 1956
3,8,10,14 recorded December 6, 1956

Personnel

Performance
 Dinah Washington - vocals
Quincy Jones and His Orchestra
 Quincy Jones - conductor, arranger (except tracks 4, 5 and 8)
 Ernie Wilkins - arranger (4 and 5)
 Benny Golson - arranger (8)
 Don Elliott - trumpet, mellophonium, vibraphone, bongos; xylophone (3)
 Jimmy Maxwell - trumpet
 Doc Severinsen - trumpet
 Charlie Shavers - trumpet
 Clark Terry - trumpet
 Bernie Glow - trumpet (1–5, 8, 10, 14)
 Nick Travis - trumpet (1–5, 8, 10, 14)
 Ernie Royal - trumpet (6, 7, 9, 11–13)
 Joe Wilder - trumpet (6, 7, 9, 11–13)
 Jimmy Cleveland - trombone
 Urbie Green - trombone
 Quentin Jackson - trombone
 Tommy Mitchell - bass trombone
 Hal McKusick - flute, alto saxophone
 Anthony Ortega - alto saxophone, clarinet
 Jerome Richardson - tenor saxophone, clarinet
 Lucky Thompson - tenor saxophone, clarinet
 Danny Bank - bass clarinet, baritone saxophone
 Clarence "Sleepy" Anderson - piano, celeste
 Barry Galbraith - guitar
 Milt Hinton - double bass
 Osie Johnson - drums (1–5, 8, 10, 14)
 Jimmy Crawford - drums (6, 7, 9, 11–13)

Production
 Bob Shad - orig. producer
 John S. Wilson - orig. liner notes
 Murray Garrett and Gene Howard - photography
Reissue
 Ben Young - producer and supervisor, research, restoration
 Carlos Kase - assistant producer
 Peter Pullman - editing
 Suha Gur - digital mastering
 Tom Greenwood and Bryan Koniarz - production coordination
 Richard Seidel - executive producer
 Brian Priestley - liner notes
 Patricia Lie and Hat Nguyen - art direction
 Sheryl Lutz-Brown - design
 Chuck Stewart - photography

References

1957 albums
Dinah Washington albums
EmArcy Records albums
Albums produced by Bob Shad
Albums arranged by Quincy Jones
Albums conducted by Quincy Jones